St Mary's Church is the oldest parish church in the town of Stockport, Greater Manchester, England.  It stands in Churchgate overlooking the market place.  The church is recorded in the National Heritage List for England as a designated Grade I listed building.  It is an active Anglican parish church in the diocese of Chester, the archdeaconry of Macclesfield and the deanery of Stockport.

History

A church was on the site by 1190.  A sandstone church was built during the incumbency of Richard de Vernon, 1306- 1320 and only its chancel remains.  The rest of the present church was built between 1813 and 1817 to the design of Lewis Wyatt.  There was a further restoration in 1848 to replace weathered masonry. Further restoration was carried out in 1882. The tower originated in the 14th century and was rebuilt in 1612–16 and again in 1810.

Architecture

Structure
The chancel is built in local red sandstone in the decorated style.  The rest of the church is Runcorn sandstone in the perpendicular style. Its plan consists of a west tower, a wide nave with galleries, a south porch, and a chancel with a vestry to its north.

Fittings and furniture
The roof of the chancel is the original single-framed timber roof.  In the sanctuary is a double piscina, a large triple sedilia and, in a recess, the damaged effigy of Richard de Vernon, who was rector of Stockport from 1306 to 1334.  In the church are a number of monuments, including one dated 1753 by Daniel Sephton to the memory of William Wright.  Other memorials include one to Sir George Warren who died in 1801 by Sir Richard Westmacott depicting a standing female figure by an urn on a pillar, to Rev Charles Prescott who died in 1820, also by Westmacott, showing a seated effigy, to James Antrobus Newton who died in 1823 by Bacon junior and S. Manning showing a kneeling female figure, and to Mrs Hawall who died in 1852 by Latham of Manchester showing angels hovering over her body. On the chancel arch are the coat of arms of George III in plaster.   The parish registers begin in 1584.  There is a ring of ten bells.  Seven of these were cast by John Rudhall in 1817 and the other three by John Taylor & Co in 1897.

External features
The gateway to the church and a nearby drinking fountain are listed at Grade II*.  The gateway was designed by Lewis Wyatt and consists of three pointed archways, with crocketed finials above the centre arch.

A rectory was built for the church in 1744 to replace an earlier timber-framed building of 16th-century origin. It was the home of rectors, and later bishops of Stockport, until the 1950s. It is now part of a Travel Inn and is a Grade II* listed building.  The old ice house still exists within the grounds.

Gallery

See also

List of churches in Greater Manchester
Grade I listed churches in Greater Manchester
Listed buildings in Stockport

References

Church of England church buildings in Greater Manchester
Grade I listed churches in Greater Manchester
English Gothic architecture in Greater Manchester
Stockport
Saint Mary's Church
Diocese of Chester